5th FFCC Awards 
January 4, 2001

Best Film: 
 Traffic 
The 5th Florida Film Critics Circle Awards, given on January 4, 2001, honored the best in film for 2000.

Winners
Best Actor: 
Geoffrey Rush - Quills
Best Actress: 
Ellen Burstyn - Requiem for a Dream
Best Animated Film:
Chicken Run
Best Cast: 
State and Main
Best Cinematography: 
The Man Who Wasn't There - Roger Deakins
Best Director: 
Steven Soderbergh - Erin Brockovich and Traffic
Best Documentary Film:
The Life and Times of Hank Greenberg
Best Film: 
'''Traffic
Best Foreign Language Film: 
Wo hu cang long (Crouching Tiger, Hidden dragon) • Taiwan/Hong Kong/United States/China
Best Newcomer: 
Kate Hudson - Almost Famous
Best Score: 
O Brother, Where Art Thou?
Best Screenplay: 
State and Main - David Mamet
Best Supporting Actor: 
Benicio del Toro - Traffic
Best Supporting Actress: 
Frances McDormand - Almost Famous and Wonder Boys

References

2
F